Vincenzo Manfredini (22 October 1737 – 5 or 16 August 1799)  was an Italian composer, harpsichordist and a music theorist.

Biography
Manfredini was born in Pistoia, near Florence.

He studied music with his father, Francesco Onofrio Manfredini. Then he studied with Perti in Bologna and Fioroni in Milan.  In 1758 his older brother Giuseppe, a castrato, went to Moscow with Locatelli's opera troupe, and Vincenzo went with him, possibly as one of the troupe.  Moving to St. Petersburg, he became maestro di cappella to Peter Fedorovich, who on becoming Emperor in 1762 made him maestro of the court's Italian opera company.  Confirmed in this post by Catherine II, he composed operas and occasional works, but on Galuppi's arrival in 1765 he was relegated to composing the ballets performed with Galuppi's operas and to serving as harpsichord teacher to Pavel Petrovich, heir to the throne.

In 1769 he returned with a pension to Bologna. After two attempts at opera, Manfredini devoted himself mainly to writing and teaching, also publishing a set of symphonies (1776) and string quartets (?1781).

When Pavel Petrovich became Emperor in 1796, he invited his former teacher, who arrived in September 1798, but took up no post and died in St. Petersburg the next year. Manfredini's  theoretical research  (Venice, 1775) has two parts, an introduction to the elements of music and to keyboard accompaniment. It was translated into Russian by Stepan Degtyaryov, a Russian composer, conductor and singer.

The observations of Manfredini on the proper method of teaching singing aroused vigorous opposition from Giovanni Battista Mancini. The second edition (Venice, 1797) was much revised and enlarged with new sections on singing and counterpoint. Manfredini composed numerous operas, as well as ballets, cantatas, sacred music (including a requiem), symphonies, string quartets, concertos, and chamber works.

Vincenzo Manfredini died on 16 August 1799 in St. Petersburg, Russia.

Operas written for Russian imperial court
Semiramide (Узнанная Семирамида, 1760, St Petersburg)
L'Olimpiade (Олимпиада, 24 November 1762 Moscow)
La pupilla (1763, St Petersburg)
La finta ammalata (1763, St Petersburg)
Carlo Magno (Карл Великий, 24 November 1763 St Petersburg, revised 1764, St Petersburg)

References

 Jean Grundy Fanelli, The Manfredini Family of Musicians of Pistoia, 1684-1803, in : Studi musicali, 26 (1997), pp. 187–232.
 David J. Buch, Magic flutes and enchanted forests : The supernatural in eighteenth-century musical theatre, The University of Chicago Press, Chicago, 2008, 450 pp.
 Julianne Baird, An 18th-Century Controversy About the Trill: Mancini vs. Manfredini, in : Early Music, xxv (1987), pp. 36–45. 
 Reinhard Strohm (ed.), The eighteenth-century diaspora of Italian music and musicians, Brepols Publishers, Turnhout (BE), 2001, 356 pp.
 Marina Ritzarev (Rytsareva), Anna Porfireva, The Italian diaspora in eighteenth-century Russia, in :  « The eighteenth-century diaspora of Italian music and musicians », (cf. supra).
 Oscar George Theodore Sonneck, Catalogue of Opera Librettos printed before 1800, 2 vol., 
 Michael Talbot, Manfredini, Vincenzo, in : The New Grove Dictionary of Music and Musicians,  Macmillan, London, 1980, vol. XI, p. 615.
 Dennis Libby, Manfredini, Vincenzo, in : The Grove Dictionary of Opera, Macmillan, London, vol. 3, p. 182.

External links
 
 YouTube Harpsichord Concerto in B flat major, Irini Shneyerova, harpsichord, Musica Petropolitana, on period instruments.
 YouTube Piano Concerto in B flat major, Felicja Blumental, piano, Mozarteum Orchestra of Salzburg, Michiyoshi Inoue, conductor.
 YouTube Sonata III in d minor, Falerno Ducande, harpsichord.
 YouTube Sonata IV in C major, Falerno Ducande, harpsichord.
 YouTube Quartetto n. 5 in Sol Maggiore: II. Adagio, Quartetto Eleusi.

Italian opera composers
Male opera composers
Italian male classical composers
Italian harpsichordists
Italian music theorists
18th-century Italian composers
18th-century Italian male musicians
People from the Province of Pistoia
1737 births
1799 deaths
18th-century keyboardists